This is a glossary of terms used in the field of Reconfigurable computing and reconfigurable computing systems, as opposed to the traditional Von Neumann architecture.

See also

 Glossary of computer terms

Reconfigurable computing
Reconfigurable computing
Wikipedia glossaries using description lists